Patrick Gordon Stanton (born 13 September 1944) is a Scottish former football player and manager.

Stanton played for Hibernian for most of his career, making nearly 400 league appearances. Late in his career, he had a short and successful spell with Celtic. Stanton also made 16 appearances for Scotland. After retiring as a player, he assisted Alex Ferguson at Aberdeen and managed Cowdenbeath, Dunfermline Athletic and Hibernian.

Club career
Stanton is the great-great nephew of Michael Whelahan (a founder of Hibernian and its first captain) and the great-nephew of Hibernian centre forward James Hendren. He signed for the club in 1963 and made his professional debut later that year. He established himself in the Hibs first team, playing either in defence or midfield. Stanton captained Hibs when they won the 1972 Scottish League Cup Final.

Stanton left Hibs in 1976 when he was transferred to Celtic in a swap deal for Jackie McNamara, Sr. Jock Stein, who had briefly managed Stanton at Hibs in the 1960s, identified Stanton as the man to stop Celtic conceding soft goals. This was an apparent success, as Celtic won the Scottish Cup and the Scottish league championship in 1976–77.

Stanton suffered a bad injury early in the 1977–78 season, which eventually forced his retirement from playing. Hibs and Celtic played a testimonial match for Stanton on 30 April 1978.

International career
Stanton was selected three times by the Scotland under-23 team early in his career. He won 16 caps for Scotland between 1966 and 1974, captaining the side three times. He also played for the Scotland under-21 team as an over-age player and represented the Scottish League.

Coaching and management
Stanton got a start in coaching when Alex Ferguson made him his assistant at Aberdeen, a position he held for one season, that resulted in winning the Premier Division title together. He then managed Cowdenbeath, then Dunfermline Athletic. He returned to Hibs in 1982, but his spell in the manager's chair at Easter Road was unsuccessful and he resigned in 1984. Stanton was also manager of the Scotland semi pro team for the Four nations tournament in 1981 and 1982.

Honours 

 Hibernian
 Scottish League Cup: 1972–73
 Summer Cup: 1963–64
 Drybrough Cup: 1972–73, 1973–74

 Celtic
 Scottish Premier Division: 1976–77
 Scottish Cup: 1976–77

 Scotland
 British Home Championship: 1971–72

 Individual
 SFWA Footballer of the Year: 1969–70
 Scottish Football Hall of Fame: Inducted 2012
 Hibernian Hall of Fame: Inducted 2012
 Hibs Special Merit Award: 2021–22

Other activities
After leaving the club as player and manager, Stanton helps Hibernian with their matchday hospitality.
Following complications and surgery after the birth in 2012 of his twin grandsons, Stanton has been devoting his time to support of brain-damaged children.

See also
List of Scotland national football team captains

References

1944 births
Living people
Footballers from Edinburgh
Association football midfielders
Scottish footballers
Scotland international footballers
Bonnyrigg Rose Athletic F.C. players
Hibernian F.C. players
Celtic F.C. players
Scottish Football League players
Scottish football managers
Scottish people of Irish descent
Cowdenbeath F.C. managers
Dunfermline Athletic F.C. managers
Hibernian F.C. managers
Aberdeen F.C. non-playing staff
Scottish Football League representative players
Scottish Football League managers
Scotland under-21 international footballers
Scotland under-23 international footballers
Scottish Football Hall of Fame inductees
United Soccer Association players
People educated at St Augustine's High School, Edinburgh